Army of One is the thirteenth studio album by the American heavy metal band Riot. It was released on July 12, 2006.

According to the official website, the album was recorded in 2003 and Mike DiMeo was effectively out of the band by the time it was released. This would be his last studio album with the band.  It is the last Riot album to feature long time bassist Pete Perez and the first to feature drummer Frank Gilchriest, primarily known for his work with the band Virgin Steele.

Track listing

Japanese edition bonus track

Personnel

Band members
 Mike DiMeo - lead and backing vocals, Hammond organ
 Mark Reale - electric lead and rhythm guitars, acoustic guitars, banjo, backing vocals, strings arrangements, producer
 Mike Flyntz - electric lead and rhythm guitars
 Pete Perez - bass
 Frank Gilchriest - drums

Additional musicians
Bruno Ravel - keyboards, backing vocals, producer, engineer, mixing
Tony Harnell - backing vocals
Andy Aledort - guitar solo on "Alive in the City"

Production
Jeff Allen - executive producer
Paul Orofino - engineer, mastering

References

External links
Official Riot Army of One website

2006 albums
Riot V albums
EMI Records albums